Starlite Festival is an international music festival that take place in a natural outdoor space inside the quarry of Nagüeles, located in the Spanish city of Marbella.

Starlite has become the cultural festival of reference in Europe  with a daily programme that includes music, fashion, art, film and gastronomy opening its doors every day for a month with shows at the only club in the world inside a quarry. Its auditorium only counts with 2.200 seats to offer intimate and close concerts where the audience lives a unique experience with the stars. In addition, Starlite dedicates one night to philanthropy celebrating Starlite Gala hosted by Antonio Banderas, which has become the largest charity event in Spain.

In previous years , the festival brought together political, intellectual, athletes and celebrities with more than a hundred public figures, positioning it as one of the most significant social events of this country.

In just two years of existence, the international press  has already listed it as one of the most important festivals of Europe, being compared to the Monte-Carlo Sporting Summer Festival.

History 

In 1983, prince Alfonso von Hohenlohe, singer Julio Iglesias and tenor Plácido Domingo organized a musical event with a recital starred by the tenor in the Nagüeles quarry of Marbella, using the space as a natural auditorium for its excellent acoustic qualities and privileged natural environment. That would be the historical precedent and precursor of the Starlite Festival, that finally took shape thirty years later, in 2012.

Emerged around the Starlite Gala, the festival was founded by Sandra Garcia-Sanjuan and Ignacio Maluquer marriage in 2012, holding its first edition from 13 July to 14 August of that year.

In 2013 the festival reopened its doors celebrating its second edition, achieving a great response from the audience one more time.

Awards and recognition 

Starlite has become in just two editions in the largest leisure and tourism business in Costa del Sol area. A fact that made them get a partnership with Marca España, becoming a cultural event supported by them.

Carlos Espinosa de los Monteros, the high commissioner of the government for Marca España, emphasized the value of Starlite in terms of promotion and as a tourist propellant. "Starlite brings quality, experience and well known music figures that make it become a focus of attention in which we want to be present as Marca España", he has said, adding that "Starlite will be wrapped by Marca España, because it will make a very good projection of the Spanish image".

In 2014, the Festival has been chosen as the best tourism initiative of Málaga by los premios 'El Caminante' of the newspaper El Mundo that were handed on 2 April in the Auditorio Edgar Neville of the Council of Malaga.

Editions

I edition 

After more than 30 years without use, the quarry of Nagüeles, returned to recover the light of the golden ages of Marbella on 13 July, of 2012. George Benson opened the stage of Starlite with great success, which was followed by other concerts during its first month of life.

Over 40,000 people visited Starlite this year and enjoyed all the leisure of the Starlite Lounge. Shows with dancers of television, the best music and cuisine of El Bulli from Paco Roncero's catering completed the offer of the first edition of the festival with great review.

It programmed the following concerts:

 14 July 2012: George Benson
 16 July 2012: Roger Hodgson 
 21 July 2012: Armando Manzanero
 22 July 2012: Tony Bennett
 27 July 2012: Christopher Cross
 29 July 2012: Hugh Laurie
 30 July 2012: Paul Anka
 2 August 2012: Miguel Bosé
 3 August 2012: Rosario Flores and Lolita Flores with Antonio Carmona
 4 August 2012: Starlite Gala
 9 August 2012: Simple Minds
 11 August 2012: Raphael
 12 August 2012: Julio Iglesias
 14 August 2012: Estopa

II edition 

The second edition of Starlite returned to Marbella on 23 July packed with new activities. Besides the variety of concerts, clubs and restaurants, Starlite 2013 added a daily schedule of themed parties, fashion shows, film premieres and art exhibitions.

More than 60,000 people had the opportunity to see for free the shows of Roko accompanied by the Starlite dance troupe, the preview movies like World War Z of Brad Pitt, Jordi Molla's and El Hombre de Negro's art exhibitions and the fashion show of Cosmic Girls, with Laura Sánchez, Malena Costa and the rest of the best Spanish tops.

It programmed the following concerts:

 24 July 2013: Bryan Adams
 27 July 2013: Jamie Cullum
 28 July 2013: Noa
 02/08/2013: Una noche movida, a unique concert of Nacho García Vega (Nacha Pop), Alejo Stivel (Tequila), Nacho Campillo (Tam Tam Go) and Rafa Sánchez (La Unión) played with Hombres G
 03/08/2013: Julio Iglesias
 05/08/2013: Buena Vista Social Club, with Omara Portuondo and Eliades Ochoa.
 09/08/2013: Sara Baras
 10/08/2013: Starlite Gala
 11/08/2013: Alejandro Sanz
 14 August 2013: Malú
 15 August 2013: Paco de Lucía It was his last concert in life made in Spain 
 16 August 2013: Forever Michael & Whitney
 17 August 2013: Enrique Iglesias
 21 August 2013: UB40
 23 August 2013: Grease the musical in concert
 24 August 2013: David Bisbal

III edición 

The third edition is back in the summer of 2014. It will feature great national and international artists.

Among the artists confirmed for the 2014 line-up so far are masters with the stature of Julio Iglesias, Chucho Valdés, Dani Martín, Sergio Dalma, and Rosario Flores.

In addition, Starlite 2014 will include concerts such as "Divas" starring Marta Sánchez and Gloria Gaynor, "Otra noche movida", as well as "Tribute to ABBA", Alejandro Sanz, Alejandro Fernández, Miguel Poveda, Josep Carreras and Ainhoa Arteta and Siempre Así.

Another first level international artists that will perform at this edition are Ricky Martin, Kool and the Gang, Pet Shop Boys, Tom Jones, The Beach Boys and Albert Hammond.

The programme includes the following concerts:

 23 July 2014: The Beach Boys
 24 July 2014: Chucho Valdes
 25 July 2014: Ricky Martin
 26 July 2014: Albert Hammond
 30 July 2014: Pet Shop Boys
 31 July 2014: Josep Carreras and Ainhoa Arteta
 01/08/2014: Alejandro Fernández
 02/08/2014: Miguel Poveda
 06/08/2014: Divas Marta Sánchez and Gloria Gaynor
 07/08/2014: Sergio Dalma
 09/08/2014: Starlite Gala
 13 August 2014: Julio Iglesias
 14 August 2014: Dani Martín
 15 August 2014: Otra Noche Movida
 16 August 2014: Rosario 
 17 August 2014: Tom Jones
 19 August 2014: Kool & the Gang
 20 August 2014: Siempre Así
 21 August 2014: Tribute to Abba
 22 August 2014: Alejandro Sanz

Starlite Gala 

Starlite Gala the centerpiece evening of the Starlite Project is hosted by Antonio Banderas and has become the largest charity event in Spain. Some of the many personalities who have joined Antonio and Melanie Griffith on this special night include: Daryl Hannah, Deepak Chopra, Valeria Mazza, Adriana Karembeu, Eva Longoria, Ute Ohoven and Boris Becker and many more. All proceeds from the dinner and charity action are donated to select foundations: Lágrimas y Favores, Niños en Alegría, Cudeca, Caritas and guest foundation year.

Financial support for the Starlite Gala is provided by sponsors and with logistical support from Starlite Productions, which donates its on-site team and provides production assistance.

Starlite Disco 

Starlite Disco is open every night for a month, from 23 July to 23 August. It offers a daily and varied programming, themed parties of all kinds, becoming the only outdoor disco in a natural quarry.

Starlite Gastro 

Starlite festival also has an area dedicated to haute cuisine including every year different corners and the best gourmet restaurants in the area.

Starlite Films 

The Starlite Auditorium turns once night a week into an open air summer cinema with the largest screen of Spain. Starlite 2014 is preparing its red carpet for major summer premieres, this year.

Starlite Fashion 

This festival also leaves a large space for fashion. In its past editions, Starlite hosted Gómez y Molina jewellery shows and the "Marbella Crea" event, giving the most promising Marbella young fashion designers a chance to show their work and the  "Cosmic Girls" runaway, where model and designer Laura Sánchez showed her own swimwear collection joined by her boyfriend, David Ascanio. She was accompanied by some Spanish top models such as Malena Costa, Verónica Blume and Cristina Tossio being one of the biggest impact August national events.

Starlite Art 

Starlite in previous editions has had Marbella's greatest national impact exhibitions. During the 2013 edition, the actor Jordi Mollá, El Hombre de Negro, Hubertus Von Hohenlohe and Bernardo Doral were chosen to show their work to the Starlite's audience. This had a major impact being very well received by the critics.

The Starlite Battles 

This summer, Starlite organizes the first edition of Starlite Battles. A contest for music bands that want to show their music and use the Starlite platform to promote themselves.

References

External links 
 www.starlitefestival.com
 Diario Sur -Starlite crea 300 puestos de trabajo
 ABC- Starlite, El festival revelación de Europa
 El Mundo-UB40 dará su único concierto en España en el 'Starlite Festival' de Marbella
 ABC-La banda británica, que ha vendido más de 70 millones de discos, actuará el 21 de agosto en el auditorio de La Cantera
 Diario Sur-UB40 dará su único concierto en España en el 'Starlite Festival' de Marbella
 Turismo Andalucía Starlite Festival
 La Opinión de Málaga – Roko se une al elenco del Starlite Festival de Marbella
 Guia del Ocio – El Auditorio La Cantera de Marbella contará con las actuaciones de Jamie Cullum, Julio Iglesias y Alejandro Sanz, entre otros
 Vanitatis – Noticias de starlite festival
 Europa Press – STARLITE FESTIVAL 2013: JULIO IGLESIAS Y PACO DE LUCÍA
  Europa FM – STARLITE FESTIVAL 2013
 Intereconomia-Recuperar el Glamour de Marbella
  El Mundo-Alejandro Sanz, Julio Iglesias y Paco de Lucía estarán en el Starlite Festival de Marbella
  Lo que Interesa- StarLite Festival una cita con la música y la gastronomía.
2014:
 Premios a la excelencia turística.
 Marbella busca nuevos y exclusivos visitantes en los mercados internacionales
 Marta Sánchez, una diva para Starlite Festival 2014: los primeros nombres del cartel
 Rosario Flores actuará el 16 de agosto en el Starlite Festival de Marbella
 Rosario Flores y ´Otra Noche Movida´ se suman al Starlite 2014
 Starlite contará de nuevo con la presencia de la artista Rosario Flores en esta tercera edición
 Pet Shop Boys actuará en la gala Starlite de Marbella el 30 de julio
 Tom Jones y The Beach Boys se unen al cartel del festival Starlite de Marbella
 La banda californiana abrirá el cartel del festival Starlite el 23 de julio y el cantante británico regresará el 17 de agosto
 The Beach Boys actuarán en julio en Marbella
 Albert Hammond actuará el 26 de julio en el festival Starlite de Marbella 
 Albert Hammond "ficha" por el Starlite Festival
 Albert Hammond actuará el 26 de julio en el festival Starlite de Marbella
 Albert Hammond actuará el 26 de julio en el festival Starlite de Marbella

Music festivals in Spain
Marbella